"What Comes Naturally" is a song by Scottish singer Sheena Easton for her 10th album, What Comes Naturally (1991). The single reached number four in Australia and number 19 in the United States.

Music video

The video for the song was directed by British director Andy Morahan.

Charts

Weekly charts

Year-end charts

References

External links
 [ What Comes Naturally] at AllMusic

1991 songs
1991 singles
MCA Records singles
Music videos directed by Andy Morahan
Sheena Easton songs
Songs written by Antonina Armato